Robert Woof may refer to:

Robert Woof (politician) (1911–1997), British Labour Party politician, MP 1956–1979
Robert Woof (scholar) (1931–2005), English academic